Richard Lehman is a British primary care physician and academic and senior research fellow at the department of primary health care at the University of Oxford. He writes a weekly review of journals (which pulls no punches), on the website of the British Medical Journal and of the Oxford University Centre for Evidence-Based Medicine. He has authored numerous scientific papers on topics including evidence-based medicine and patient-centred outcomes research. He has a special interest in cardiology and palliative care, and with Miriam Johnson he published the first book on  Heart Failure and Palliative Care in 2006.

References

21st-century British medical doctors
Living people
Alumni of the University of Oxford
Year of birth missing (living people)